Heart Like a Gun is the third studio album by singer Fiona, released on October 2, 1989 through Atlantic Records. It reached #150 on the Billboard 200 chart in 1990 and remained charted for sixteen weeks. The album features singer/bassist Kip Winger and drummer Rod Morgenstein from the band Winger, with Kip dueting with Fiona on "Everything You Do (You're Sexing Me)".

Track listing

Personnel
Fiona – vocals
Kip Winger – vocals (track 2), bass
Brad Gillis – guitar
Rod Morgenstein – drums
Technical
Beau Hill – engineering, mixing, production
Keith Olsen – engineering, mixing, production
Gordon Fordyce – mixing
Mark Segal – engineering
Joel Stoner – engineering
Jeff DeMorris – engineering
George Counnas – engineering
Fred Kelly – engineering
Matt Freeman – engineering
Ted Jensen – mastering

Charts

References

Fiona (singer) albums
1989 albums
Atlantic Records albums
Albums produced by Beau Hill
Albums produced by Keith Olsen